The Denmark Feist, sometimes written DenMark Feist, is a breed of feist from Virginia in the United States.

Overview
The Denmark Feist is descended from a single dog acquired by the Slade family of Chatham, Virginia in 1917, supposedly the dog was bartered from a travelling salesman for three opossum hides, a large raccoon and a wagon wheel. The family were so impressed with the hunting abilities of this dog that they used him as the foundation sire of a line of dogs. In 1984 Mark Slade, with friend Dennis Willis, unveiled these dogs as a breed, in 1986 the DenMark Treeing Feist Association was formed.

The Denmark Feist is used to hunt feral pig, bobcat and squirrel, they are said to be silent hunters that can hunt game on the ground or run the game into trees for the hunter to shoot.

See also
 Dogs portal
 List of dog breeds

References

Dog breeds originating in the United States